Correfocs; literally in English "fire-runs") are among the most striking features present in Valencian and Catalan festivals. In the correfoc, a group of individuals will dress as devils and light up fireworks – fixed on devil's pitchforks or strung above the route. Dancing to the sound of a rhythmic drum group, they set off their fireworks among crowds of spectators. The spectators that participate dress to protect themselves against small burns and attempt to get as close as possible to the devils, running with the fire. Other spectators will watch from "safe" distances, rapidly retreating as necessary.

The correfoc can come in many forms. Some are simple parades using fireworks and effigies of the devil. In Sitges, it is common for a crowd to line a street, while participants run through a tunnel of fireworks. Correfocs are run during the Festival of La Mercè in Barcelona, the Festival of Santa Tecla in Tarragona and the Festival of Saint Narcissus in Girona.

Another typical Catalan folkloric expression of this sort takes place in L'Arboç. The highlight of the village's feast is the Carretillada. In the evening of the feast day, the town square is made to look like Hell. For nearly half an hour, "devils" burn their carretilles (carts), jumping around ceaselessly, while a large "sceptre of Lucifer" and the "pitchfork of the Diablessa (she-devil)" shoot fire-jets and other pyrotechnics. Every year, the carretillada is a bit different, because the 'colla' does not give up novelties that are added each year to add to the spectacle.

See also
Ball de diables
Toro de fuego

References

External links

 Correfoc images
 Els Ducs del Foc 
 Colla del Basilisc 
 Grup del Correfoc del Follet i la Fantasma de Sant Feliu de Codines 
 Xaldiga de Manresa 
 Ball de diables de L'Arboç
 Correfoc photos and films
 Fills de Satanàs de l'Spelunca Diabòlica
 Aquelarre de Cervera
 Dimonis de l'Avern
 Federació de Dimonis i Diables del País Valencià
 Great Devils in Panamá
 Senyors del foc, Castelló d'Empúries, Catalunya
 La Merce Part 3
 Pàgina oficial de la Federació de Diables i Dimonis de Catalunya 
 Dimonis de Campanar
 Diables de Terrassa
 Image Gallery, Correfoc at L'Eliana, Valencia, Spain

Catalan folklore
Catalan symbols
Catalan words and phrases
Valencian culture